

The Brooklyn Heights Historic District is a historic district that comprises much of the Brooklyn Heights neighborhood of Brooklyn, New York City. It was named a National Historic Landmark in January, 1965, designated a New York City Landmark in November, 1965, and added to the National Register of Historic Places in October, 1966.

The district is bounded by Cadman Plaza West (Old Fulton Street) on the north, the Brooklyn-Queens Expressway on the west, Atlantic Avenue on the south, and an irregular line that partly follows Clinton and Henry Streets on the east. It is of national significance as an early commuter suburb, and as a remarkably well-preserved 19th-century urban streetscape.

Grace Episcopal Church, designed by Richard Upjohn, which held its first service in 1848, is in the district, as are Plymouth Church of the Pilgrims, Our Lady of Lebanon Maronite Cathedral, the First Presbyterian Church, the First Unitarian Congregational Society, the Center for Brooklyn History, the Heights Casino and Casino Apartments, Packer Collegiate Institute, and St. Ann's and the Holy Trinity Church, among other historically notable buildings.

The development of Brooklyn Heights as a fashionable residential area began with the introduction of ferry service to Manhattan in 1814. By the mid-19th century, the area was served by three ferry services as well as the Brooklyn and Jamaica Railroad, and it was one of New York's premier residential addresses. The latter distinction was eventually eclipsed by Fifth Avenue. Some of its streets are named for early real estate developers.

Gallery

See also
List of New York City Designated Landmarks in Brooklyn
List of National Historic Landmarks in New York City
National Register of Historic Places listings in Kings County, New York

References
Notes

External links

National Historic Landmarks in New York City
Brooklyn Heights
Historic districts on the National Register of Historic Places in Brooklyn
New York City designated historic districts
New York City Designated Landmarks in Brooklyn